Louis Van Parijs, also spelled Parys (c. 1908 – ?) was a Belgian swimmer who won two medals in the 200m breaststroke at the 1926 and 1927 European Aquatics Championships. He was the national champion in the same event in 1925–1927, 1930 and 1937, but also competed in freestyle swimming and won the 200m and 400m national titles in 1927. He participated in the 1928 Summer Olympics but did not reach the finals.

References

1900s births
Year of death missing
Belgian male freestyle swimmers
Swimmers at the 1928 Summer Olympics
Belgian male breaststroke swimmers
Olympic swimmers of Belgium
European Aquatics Championships medalists in swimming